The 2003–04 Mighty Ducks of Anaheim season was the team's 11th season in the National Hockey League (NHL). After making it to the 2003 Stanley Cup Final and losing in the seventh game, the team placed fourth in the Pacific Division and 12th in the Western Conference, thereby failing to qualify for the 2004 Stanley Cup playoffs.

Offseason
In the 2003 NHL Entry Draft, the Ducks selected Ryan Getzlaf with their first first-round pick, 19th overall, and Corey Perry with their second first-round pick, 28th overall.

Forward Steve Rucchin was named team captain following Paul Kariya's departure to the Colorado Avalanche via free agency.

Regular season
The departure of franchise player Paul Kariya marked another new era which had many fans angered as well as worried about the teams near future repeating the on-ice success. Signing Sergei Fedorov and Vaclav Prospal in the summer relieved most of the fans' fear. Both players delivered as expected but scoring decreased for several reasons: Mike Leclerc played only 10 games, Rob Niedermayer played only 55 games, though enjoying a good season and Andy McDonald stayed healthy but had trouble repeating his performance after missing half of last season due to a concussion; Chistov suffered from "sophomore jinx" collecting only 2 goals and Jason Krog could not repeat another season like the one he had before. Rookie Joffrey Lupul had a wonderful rookie campaign with a bright future ahead. Overall, while the team had more potential scoring depth, several players fell short to enjoy and repeat the scoring touch they showed last season. 

The defense performed well enough but J. S. Giguere failed at times to play the way he did the year before allowing soft goals. Later that season backup goalie Martin Gerber saw more ice time challenging Giguere for the number one spot and nearly outperforming him.

Playing away from home did not do them well as the Mighty Ducks won 19 games at home but only 10 games on the road.

Final standings

Schedule and results

|- align="center" bgcolor="#FFBBBB"
|1||L||October 8, 2003||1–4 || align="left"| @ Dallas Stars (2003–04) ||0–1–0–0 || 
|- align="center" bgcolor="#FFBBBB"
|2||L||October 9, 2003||1–3 || align="left"| @ Nashville Predators (2003–04) ||0–2–0–0 || 
|- align="center" bgcolor="#FFBBBB"
|3||L||October 12, 2003||0–2 || align="left"|  Phoenix Coyotes (2003–04) ||0–3–0–0 || 
|- align="center" bgcolor="#FFBBBB"
|4||L||October 17, 2003||0–3 || align="left"|  Ottawa Senators (2003–04) ||0–4–0–0 || 
|- align="center" bgcolor="#FF6F6F"
|5||L||October 19, 2003||3–4 OT|| align="left"|  Boston Bruins (2003–04) ||0–4–0–1 || 
|- align="center" bgcolor="#CCFFCC" 
|6||W||October 21, 2003||2–0 || align="left"| @ San Jose Sharks (2003–04) ||1–4–0–1 || 
|- align="center" bgcolor="#CCFFCC" 
|7||W||October 22, 2003||4–3 OT|| align="left"|  Philadelphia Flyers (2003–04) ||2–4–0–1 || 
|- align="center" bgcolor="#FFBBBB"
|8||L||October 24, 2003||2–5 || align="left"|  Buffalo Sabres (2003–04) ||2–5–0–1 || 
|- align="center" 
|9||T||October 26, 2003||1–1 OT|| align="left"|  Chicago Blackhawks (2003–04) ||2–5–1–1 || 
|- align="center" bgcolor="#CCFFCC" 
|10||W||October 28, 2003||3–1 || align="left"| @ New York Rangers (2003–04) ||3–5–1–1 || 
|- align="center" bgcolor="#CCFFCC" 
|11||W||October 29, 2003||4–2 || align="left"| @ Washington Capitals (2003–04) ||4–5–1–1 || 
|-

|- align="center" bgcolor="#FFBBBB"
|12||L||November 1, 2003||1–4 || align="left"| @ New York Islanders (2003–04) ||4–6–1–1 || 
|- align="center" bgcolor="#FFBBBB"
|13||L||November 2, 2003||1–3 || align="left"| @ Chicago Blackhawks (2003–04) ||4–7–1–1 || 
|- align="center" bgcolor="#FF6F6F"
|14||OTL||November 4, 2003||1–2 OT|| align="left"| @ St. Louis Blues (2003–04) ||4–7–1–2 || 
|- align="center" bgcolor="#FF6F6F"
|15||OTL||November 8, 2003||3–4 OT|| align="left"| @ Phoenix Coyotes (2003–04) ||4–7–1–3 || 
|- align="center" bgcolor="#CCFFCC" 
|16||W||November 9, 2003||2–1 OT|| align="left"|  Phoenix Coyotes (2003–04) ||5–7–1–3 || 
|- align="center" bgcolor="#CCFFCC" 
|17||W||November 12, 2003||5–1 || align="left"|  Toronto Maple Leafs (2003–04) ||6–7–1–3 || 
|- align="center" bgcolor="#CCFFCC" 
|18||W||November 16, 2003||4–3 || align="left"|  St. Louis Blues (2003–04) ||7–7–1–3 || 
|- align="center" bgcolor="#FF6F6F"
|19||OTL||November 18, 2003||1–2 OT|| align="left"| @ Colorado Avalanche (2003–04) ||7–7–1–4 || 
|- align="center" 
|20||T||November 19, 2003||3–3 OT|| align="left"| @ Dallas Stars (2003–04) ||7–7–2–4 || 
|- align="center" bgcolor="#FF6F6F"
|21||OTL||November 21, 2003||3–4 OT|| align="left"|  Nashville Predators (2003–04) ||7–7–2–5 || 
|- align="center" 
|22||T||November 26, 2003||3–3 OT|| align="left"|  New Jersey Devils (2003–04) ||7–7–3–5 || 
|- align="center" bgcolor="#CCFFCC" 
|23||W||November 28, 2003||4–3 || align="left"|  Chicago Blackhawks (2003–04) ||8–7–3–5 || 
|- align="center" 
|24||T||November 30, 2003||1–1 OT|| align="left"| @ Minnesota Wild (2003–04) ||8–7–4–5 || 
|-

|- align="center" bgcolor="#FFBBBB"
|25||L||December 2, 2003||1–2 || align="left"| @ Columbus Blue Jackets (2003–04) ||8–8–4–5 || 
|- align="center" bgcolor="#FFBBBB"
|26||L||December 3, 2003||2–7 || align="left"| @ Detroit Red Wings (2003–04) ||8–9–4–5 || 
|- align="center" bgcolor="#FFBBBB"
|27||L||December 5, 2003||2–6 || align="left"| @ Atlanta Thrashers (2003–04) ||8–10–4–5 || 
|- align="center" bgcolor="#CCFFCC" 
|28||W||December 7, 2003||4–0 || align="left"|  Dallas Stars (2003–04) ||9–10–4–5 || 
|- align="center" bgcolor="#CCFFCC" 
|29||W||December 10, 2003||3–2 || align="left"|  San Jose Sharks (2003–04) ||10–10–4–5 || 
|- align="center" bgcolor="#FFBBBB"
|30||L||December 13, 2003||0–2 || align="left"| @ San Jose Sharks (2003–04) ||10–11–4–5 || 
|- align="center" bgcolor="#FFBBBB"
|31||L||December 14, 2003||2–3 || align="left"|  Edmonton Oilers (2003–04) ||10–12–4–5 || 
|- align="center" bgcolor="#CCFFCC" 
|32||W||December 19, 2003||1–0 || align="left"|  Colorado Avalanche (2003–04) ||11–12–4–5 || 
|- align="center" bgcolor="#FFBBBB"
|33||L||December 21, 2003||1–2 || align="left"|  San Jose Sharks (2003–04) ||11–13–4–5 || 
|- align="center" bgcolor="#FFBBBB"
|34||L||December 22, 2003||1–2 || align="left"| @ San Jose Sharks (2003–04) ||11–14–4–5 || 
|- align="center" bgcolor="#FFBBBB"
|35||L||December 27, 2003||2–3 || align="left"| @ Florida Panthers (2003–04) ||11–15–4–5 || 
|- align="center" bgcolor="#CCFFCC" 
|36||W||December 29, 2003||2–0 || align="left"| @ Tampa Bay Lightning (2003–04) ||12–15–4–5 || 
|- align="center" bgcolor="#CCFFCC" 
|37||W||December 31, 2003||3–1 || align="left"| @ Carolina Hurricanes (2003–04) ||13–15–4–5 || 
|-

|- align="center" bgcolor="#FFBBBB"
|38||L||January 2, 2004||2–5 || align="left"| @ Buffalo Sabres (2003–04) ||13–16–4–5 || 
|- align="center" bgcolor="#FFBBBB"
|39||L||January 3, 2004||1–3 || align="left"| @ Detroit Red Wings (2003–04) ||13–17–4–5 || 
|- align="center" 
|40||T||January 5, 2004||2–2 OT|| align="left"|  Dallas Stars (2003–04) ||13–17–5–5 || 
|- align="center" 
|41||T||January 7, 2004||4–4 OT|| align="left"|  Los Angeles Kings (2003–04) ||13–17–6–5 || 
|- align="center" bgcolor="#FFBBBB"
|42||L||January 9, 2004||2–5 || align="left"|  Vancouver Canucks (2003–04) ||13–18–6–5 || 
|- align="center" 
|43||T||January 11, 2004||2–2 OT|| align="left"|  Columbus Blue Jackets (2003–04) ||13–18–7–5 || 
|- align="center" bgcolor="#FFBBBB"
|44||L||January 13, 2004||1–3 || align="left"| @ Colorado Avalanche (2003–04) ||13–19–7–5 || 
|- align="center" bgcolor="#FFBBBB"
|45||L||January 15, 2004||0–1 || align="left"| @ Edmonton Oilers (2003–04) ||13–20–7–5 || 
|- align="center" bgcolor="#CCFFCC" 
|46||W||January 17, 2004||2–1 || align="left"| @ Vancouver Canucks (2003–04) ||14–20–7–5 || 
|- align="center" bgcolor="#FFBBBB"
|47||L||January 19, 2004||1–5 || align="left"|  Calgary Flames (2003–04) ||14–21–7–5 || 
|- align="center" 
|48||T||January 21, 2004||2–2 OT|| align="left"|  Detroit Red Wings (2003–04) ||14–21–8–5 || 
|- align="center" bgcolor="#CCFFCC" 
|49||W||January 23, 2004||6–2 || align="left"|  Minnesota Wild (2003–04) ||15–21–8–5 || 
|- align="center" bgcolor="#FFBBBB"
|50||L||January 24, 2004||2–4 || align="left"| @ Los Angeles Kings (2003–04) ||15–22–8–5 || 
|- align="center" bgcolor="#FF6F6F"
|51||OTL||January 28, 2004||3–4 OT|| align="left"|  Los Angeles Kings (2003–04) ||15–22–8–6 || 
|- align="center" bgcolor="#CCFFCC" 
|52||W||January 30, 2004||4–3 OT|| align="left"|  Colorado Avalanche (2003–04) ||16–22–8–6 || 
|-

|- align="center" bgcolor="#FFBBBB"
|53||L||February 1, 2004||4–6 || align="left"| @ Calgary Flames (2003–04) ||16–23–8–6 || 
|- align="center" bgcolor="#FF6F6F"
|54||OTL||February 2, 2004||1–2 OT|| align="left"| @ Edmonton Oilers (2003–04) ||16–23–8–7 || 
|- align="center" bgcolor="#CCFFCC" 
|55||W||February 4, 2004||3–2 || align="left"|  Carolina Hurricanes (2003–04) ||17–23–8–7 || 
|- align="center" bgcolor="#CCFFCC" 
|56||W||February 11, 2004||5–3 || align="left"|  Phoenix Coyotes (2003–04) ||18–23–8–7 || 
|- align="center" bgcolor="#FFBBBB"
|57||L||February 13, 2004||1–2 || align="left"| @ Calgary Flames (2003–04) ||18–24–8–7 || 
|- align="center" bgcolor="#CCFFCC" 
|58||W||February 14, 2004||2–1 || align="left"| @ Vancouver Canucks (2003–04) ||19–24–8–7 || 
|- align="center" bgcolor="#CCFFCC" 
|59||W||February 16, 2004||3–1 || align="left"|  Dallas Stars (2003–04) ||20–24–8–7 || 
|- align="center" bgcolor="#CCFFCC" 
|60||W||February 18, 2004||3–1 || align="left"|  Columbus Blue Jackets (2003–04) ||21–24–8–7 || 
|- align="center" bgcolor="#FF6F6F"
|61||OTL||February 20, 2004||2–3 OT|| align="left"|  Nashville Predators (2003–04) ||21–24–8–8 || 
|- align="center" bgcolor="#FFBBBB"
|62||L||February 22, 2004||0–4 || align="left"| @ Dallas Stars (2003–04) ||21–25–8–8 || 
|- align="center" 
|63||T||February 23, 2004||1–1 OT|| align="left"| @ Phoenix Coyotes (2003–04) ||21–25–9–8 || 
|- align="center" bgcolor="#CCFFCC" 
|64||W||February 25, 2004||4–2 || align="left"|  Edmonton Oilers (2003–04) ||22–25–9–8 || 
|- align="center" bgcolor="#FFBBBB"
|65||L||February 28, 2004||1–2 || align="left"| @ Los Angeles Kings (2003–04) ||22–26–9–8 || 
|- align="center" bgcolor="#CCFFCC" 
|66||W||February 29, 2004||6–3 || align="left"|  Los Angeles Kings (2003–04) ||23–26–9–8 || 
|-

|- align="center" bgcolor="#CCFFCC" 
|67||W||March 3, 2004||2–0 || align="left"|  Minnesota Wild (2003–04) ||24–26–9–8 || 
|- align="center" bgcolor="#CCFFCC" 
|68||W||March 5, 2004||5–2 || align="left"| @ Chicago Blackhawks (2003–04) ||25–26–9–8 || 
|- align="center" bgcolor="#FFBBBB"
|69||L||March 6, 2004||1–2 || align="left"| @ Pittsburgh Penguins (2003–04) ||25–27–9–8 || 
|- align="center" bgcolor="#FFBBBB"
|70||L||March 8, 2004||2–5 || align="left"|  Montreal Canadiens (2003–04) ||25–28–9–8 || 
|- align="center" bgcolor="#FFBBBB"
|71||L||March 12, 2004||1–3 || align="left"|  New York Islanders (2003–04) ||25–29–9–8 || 
|- align="center" bgcolor="#FFBBBB"
|72||L||March 14, 2004||1–5 || align="left"| @ Los Angeles Kings (2003–04) ||25–30–9–8 || 
|- align="center" bgcolor="#CCFFCC" 
|73||W||March 16, 2004||3–2 OT|| align="left"| @ Phoenix Coyotes (2003–04) ||26–30–9–8 || 
|- align="center" 
|74||T||March 17, 2004||1–1 OT|| align="left"|  St. Louis Blues (2003–04) ||26–30–10–8 || 
|- align="center" bgcolor="#FFBBBB"
|75||L||March 19, 2004||2–4 || align="left"|  San Jose Sharks (2003–04) ||26–31–10–8 || 
|- align="center" bgcolor="#CCFFCC" 
|76||W||March 21, 2004||8–6 || align="left"|  Detroit Red Wings (2003–04) ||27–31–10–8 || 
|- align="center" bgcolor="#CCFFCC" 
|77||W||March 23, 2004||4–1 || align="left"| @ Nashville Predators (2003–04) ||28–31–10–8 || 
|- align="center" bgcolor="#FFBBBB"
|78||L||March 25, 2004||2–3 || align="left"| @ St. Louis Blues (2003–04) ||28–32–10–8 || 
|- align="center" bgcolor="#FFBBBB"
|79||L||March 26, 2004||1–3 || align="left"| @ Columbus Blue Jackets (2003–04) ||28–33–10–8 || 
|- align="center" bgcolor="#FFBBBB"
|80||L||March 28, 2004||1–2 || align="left"| @ Minnesota Wild (2003–04) ||28–34–10–8 || 
|- align="center" bgcolor="#FFBBBB"
|81||L||March 31, 2004||1–2 || align="left"|  Vancouver Canucks (2003–04) ||28–35–10–8 || 
|-

|- align="center" bgcolor="#CCFFCC" 
|82||W||April 4, 2004||2–1 || align="left"|  Calgary Flames (2003–04) ||29–35–10–8 || 
|-

|-
| Legend:

Player statistics

Scoring
 Position abbreviations: C = Center; D = Defense; G = Goaltender; LW = Left Wing; RW = Right Wing
  = Joined team via a transaction (e.g., trade, waivers, signing) during the season. Stats reflect time with the Mighty Ducks only.
  = Left team via a transaction (e.g., trade, waivers, release) during the season. Stats reflect time with the Mighty Ducks only.

Goaltending

Awards and records

Awards

Milestones

Transactions
The Mighty Ducks were involved in the following transactions from June 10, 2003, the day after the deciding game of the 2003 Stanley Cup Finals, through June 7, 2004, the day of the deciding game of the 2004 Stanley Cup Finals.

Trades

Players acquired

Players lost

Signings

Draft picks
Anaheim's draft picks at the 2003 NHL Entry Draft held at the Gaylord Entertainment Center in Nashville, Tennessee.

Farm teams
 Cincinnati Mighty Ducks

See also
2003–04 NHL season

Notes

References

 
 

Anaheim Ducks seasons
Anaheim
Anaheim
Mighty Ducks of Anaheim
Mighty Ducks of Anaheim